Supreme Components International Pte. Ltd. (SCI) Is a franchised distributor of high-tech electronic and LED components headquartered in Singapore. The company specializes in global distribution and value-added services pertaining to these components. Supreme is recognized as Singapore's largest electronics distributor by SourceToday.

Origin 
Founded in 2001, the company was going through a lean period facing losses before it was taken over by current president & CEO Vick Aggarwala in 2005. Under his leadership, SCI has managed to overturn its fortunes and has established themselves as a reputable franchised distributor in the region. The company has site offices in Australia, Canada, India, Indonesia, Malaysia, Philippines, Thailand, and Vietnam and serves customers in over 45 countries around the world covering Asia, Oceania, Americas and Europe and is planning to expand even further.

About the President 
President & CEO Vick Aggarwala formerly presided over Future Electronics. He was responsible for bringing Future Electronics to Asia in 1992 as the first North American distributor to enter the Asian market. He headed Nu Horizons (now part of Arrow Electronics) as its president for Asia-Pacific in Singapore. He was instrumental in establishing multiple offices in more than 12 countries during his tenure with Alcatel, Future & Nu Horizons.

With 45 years of past experience and key insights about industrial trends, Vick Aggarwala has streamlined his in-depth knowledge about the supply chain and manufacturer behaviors into tangible efforts, which has paid rich dividends for Supreme Components. SOAR listed him as one of the top 50 prominent business personalities who have led successful corporations. He was also nominated for the Entrepreneur of the Year award by Ernst & Young.

Operations 
In 2005, Vick Aggarwala bought over Supreme Components and built a diverse team and divested it. They currently operate in 9 countries world over serving customers with a culturally diverse workforce. In an interview, Vick Aggarwala claimed that he is a firm believer in the edge that human touch has over the use of technology. SCI exists to “add value at the speed of thought for customers and suppliers”. They are equally focused on both the electronic component and LED lighting industry and have an extensive list of dependable suppliers.

SCI has been actively expanding into different countries in the ASEAN and also set up a regional headquarters in India (in Bangalore) in 2011. SCI now has 12 offices in 10 different countries and are next planning to expand into Europe and China.

Vick Aggarwala's son, Piyush Aggarwala, is currently the director for the LED Lighting division. He joined the business in 2013 after migrating from Washington DC to actively help expand the business.

In FY 2019, the firm experienced a significant 40% growth due to investments made in various countries as well as improved regional and macro-economic conditions in the field of distribution of high-tech electronic components in the technology industry.

Innovations 
SCI launched an online LED product selection tool - Lighting Compass - to aid OEMs and manufacturers to easily choose the most appropriate LED chip or driver using advanced selection criteria. Supreme Components is also learnt to be backing the newly launched electronic components e-commerce website - ChipsGalaxy.

Awards and recognition 
With a well-established presence in South-East Asia, Supreme Components has bagged various honors in Singapore including the coveted Enterprise 50 Awards for a record 7 times. They have been ranked as one of the 50 best enterprises in Singapore from 2011 to 2016 and from 2019 to 2021, which is recognized by the Business Times, KPMG & in the Singapore International 100 in 2018 and 2019. Singapore Business Federation, Spring & other government bodies have also ranked SCI as a Top 1000 company between 2009 and 2019.

In 2019, 2020, 2021 and 2022, SCI was marked out as a distributor to watch out for by SourceToday in their annual rankings for Top Electronics Distributors of 2019 and was the only Asian distributor to be featured in the list dominated by mostly North American companies.

Financial Times in association with Statista ranked the top 500 High-Growth companies based on revenue growth between 2015 and 2018 in Asia-Pacific (comprising 11 countries). Supreme Components was ranked at 373rd position and 54th among Singaporean companies in this elite list. Supreme once again ranked among the Top 500 High-Growth Companies in Asia-Pacific for the rankings released in 2021.

References 

Electronic component distributors
Industrial supply companies
Electronics companies of Singapore
Singaporean companies established in 2001
Electronics companies established in 2001